Orange Is the New Black is an American comedy-drama television series created by Jenji Kohan, which premiered on July 11, 2013, on Netflix. The series, based on Piper Kerman's memoir Orange Is the New Black: My Year in a Women's Prison (2010), follows Piper Chapman (Taylor Schilling). A happily engaged New Yorker, Chapman is suddenly sent to a women's federal prison for transporting a suitcase full of drug money across international borders 10 years prior for her girlfriend at the time, Alex Vause (Laura Prepon).

The series was renewed for a seventh and final season, which was released on July 26, 2019.

Series overview

Episodes

Season 1 (2013)

Season 2 (2014)

Season 3 (2015)

Season 4 (2016)

Season 5 (2017)

Season 6 (2018)

Season 7 (2019)

See also
 List of Orange Is the New Black characters

References

External links
 
 

E
Lists of American comedy-drama television series episodes